The Marin, previously the Main Seneca Building, and originally known as the Marine Midland Trust Company Building or the "Marine Trust Building," is a 17-story Renaissance Revival style highrise in downtown Buffalo, New York. The building was previously the headquarters for Marine Midland Bank before the bank constructed One Marine Midland Center at 1 Seneca Tower, the tallest building in Buffalo. It is located in the Joseph Ellicott Historic District.

History
The building was designed by Buffalo architects Green & Wicks and was completed by Lnquist and Illsey in April 1913 on the corner of Main and Seneca streets. The building served as the headquarters for Marine Midland Bank before moving across the street into Buffalo's tallest building, One Seneca Tower.

In December 2014, the building was sold by real estate developer David L. Sweet to Paul J. Kolkmeyer, a developer and former CEO of First Niagara Bank, for $3.89 million. Kolkmeyer's firm, Amherst-based Priam Enterprises LLC, buys, manages and develops residential apartment buildings and student housing in Buffalo and the surrounding communities. In addition to purchasing the Main Seneca Building, Kolkmeyer purchased the Main Court Building at 43 Main St. (for $4.5 million), as well as the Rand Building, designed by James W. Kideney & Associates, at 14 Lafayette Square, the Roblin Building at 241 Main St., (together for $2.56 million) and The Stanton Building (also known as the Glenny Building), designed by Richard A. Waite, at 251 Main St. (for $646,569).

Paul Kolkmeyer is planning to introduce several new uses to the building. According to Business First, Kolkmeyer expects to put 25 condominiums on the building's top five floors and open a banquet facility in the first floor banking hall. Additionally, he has indicated his desire to put a small boutique hotel into the third floor, and consolidate office tenants into the remaining levels.

The public face of the Main Seneca Building has been Andrew J Shaevel who advised potential buyer David Nalbandyan in their attempt to purchase the building now works alongside Paul Kolkmeyer in the revitalization of the property.  Shaevel and Kolkmeyer joined forces however to revitalize the property where they hosted the first event on June 11, 2018 at "The Admiral Room at the Marin" the new name for the Main Seneca Building

See also
 List of tallest buildings in Buffalo
 Marine Midland Bank

References

External links
  Marine Trust Building - Priam Enterprises LLC Website
 Skyscraperpage building page
 Emporis building page

Renaissance Revival architecture in New York (state)
Commercial buildings completed in 1915
Skyscraper office buildings in Buffalo, New York
Green & Wicks buildings